The 2022–23 Stonehill Skyhawks men's ice hockey season is the 44th season of play for the program and 1st at the Division I level. The Skyhawks represent Stonehill College and are coached by David Borges, in his 9th season.

Season
After the college announced that it was promoting all of its athletic programs to Division I for the 2022–23 academic season, the ice hockey program had just a scant few months to put a schedule together. While they were able to get a few D-I schools on their slate, the Skyhawks had to rely on Division II and III teams to fill out the majority of their schedule.

Due to weather conditions, the game against Franklin Pierce that was originally scheduled for January 24 was postponed.

On February 1, the NCAA selection committee voted to remove all Stonehill games from consideration for the NCAA tournament selection. This was done primarily due to the low number of Division I games that the Skyhawks played this season. Because this was Stonehill's first season at the DI level, they were not eligible for postseason play so the ruling did not affect the program in any practical way.

Over the course of the season, two things became apparent for the Skyhawks. First, with the influx on scholarship players, the team was now significantly better than their former contemporaries. Going 17–1–2 against Division II and III opponents showed that Stonehill no longer belonged at the lower levels. However, despite setting a new program record for wins and winning percentage, Stonehill was not yet up to snuff at the Division I level. Losing their first game of the year to Long Island was probably unavoidable but the team showed little progress as the season went on. Due in part to exclusively playing D-II and III opponents for almost 4 months, the Skyhawks didn't have the ability to gage themselves against stronger competition and improve their play over the course of the year. The defense, which performed well in most games, was woefully inadequate when facing other D-I teams. The games against Lindenwood are of particular note as the Lions too were in their first season of Division I play. However, with Lindenwood playing a full D-I schedule, they were able to improve their play far more than the Skyhawks.

With more lead time for their second Division I season, Stonehill should not have to rely so heavily on the lower levels to fill up their schedule.

Departures

Recruiting

Roster
As of September 12, 2022.

|}

Standings

Schedule and results

|-
!colspan=12 style=";" | Regular Season

|-
!colspan=12 style=";" | North Country Tournament

Scoring statistics

Goaltending statistics

Note: Day and Ghaemi shared the shutout on October 25.

Rankings

Note: USCHO did not release a poll in weeks 1, 13, or 26.

References

2022-23
Stonehill
Stonehill
Stonehill
Stonehill